A Weber bar is a device used in the detection of gravitational waves first devised and constructed by physicist Joseph Weber at the University of Maryland. The device consisted of aluminium cylinders, 2 meters in length and 1 meter in diameter, antennae for detecting gravitational waves.

History
Around 1968, Weber collected what he concluded to be "good evidence" of the theorized phenomenon. However, his experiments were duplicated many times, always with a null result.

Such experiments conducted by Joseph Weber were very controversial, and his positive results with the apparatus, in particular his claim to have detected gravitational waves from SN1987A in 1987, were widely discredited. Criticisms of the study have focused on Weber's data analysis and his incomplete definitions of what strength vibration would signify a passing gravitational wave. 

Weber's first "Gravitational Wave Antenna" was on display in the Smithsonian Institution as part of "Einstein: a Centenary Exhibit" from March 1979 to March 1980.  A second is on display at the LIGO Hanford Observatory.

Weber Memorial Garden was dedicated 2019 at the University of Maryland, where Weber was a faculty member. The garden contains eight of the cores of Weber's bar detectors.

Mechanism 
These massive aluminium cylinders vibrated at a resonance frequency of 1660 hertz and were designed to be set in motion by gravitational waves predicted by Weber. Because these waves were supposed to be so weak, the cylinders had to be massive and the piezoelectric sensors had to be very sensitive, capable of detecting a change in the cylinders' lengths by about 10−16 meters.

References

Further reading 

 Weber, Joseph. How I discovered Gravitational Waves, Popular Science, Bonnier Corporation, May 1972, Vol. 200, No. 5, pp. 106–107 & 190–192, .

Gravitational-wave telescopes
Astronomy in the United States